The Billion Dollar Scandal is a 1933 American pre-Code drama film directed by Harry Joe Brown and written by Beatrice Banyard, Willard Mack and Gene Towne. The film stars Robert Armstrong, Constance Cummings, Olga Baclanova, Frank Morgan, James Gleason, Irving Pichel and Warren Hymer. The film was released on January 7, 1933 by Paramount Pictures.

Cast 
Robert Armstrong as Fingers Partos
Constance Cummings as Doris Masterson
Olga Baclanova as Anna aka GoGo
Frank Morgan as John Dudley Masterson
James Gleason as Ratsy Harris
Irving Pichel as Albert Griswold
Warren Hymer as Kid McGurn
Sidney Toler as Carter B. Moore
Berton Churchill as The Warden
Frank Albertson as Babe Partos
Walter Walker as Parker
Edmund Breese as Haddock
Purnell Pratt as Committee Chairman
William B. Davidson as Lawrence
Edward Van Sloan as Attorney Carp 
Hale Hamilton as Jackson

References

External links 
 

1933 films
American drama films
1933 drama films
Paramount Pictures films
Films directed by Harry Joe Brown
American black-and-white films
Films scored by Karl Hajos
1930s English-language films
1930s American films